Little Acre is an unincorporated town in Redding Township, Jackson County, Indiana.

References

Unincorporated communities in Jackson County, Indiana
Unincorporated communities in Indiana